Immaculate Conception Church, Stratherrick is in the Dalcrag area of Whitebridge, Inverness-shire, in the Highlands of Scotland and is a part of the Roman Catholic Diocese of Aberdeen. It is an active parish church served from Fort Augustus with regular weekly Vigil Mass at 5pm on Saturdays. It forms part of the grouping "Loch Ness Catholic Parishes". It is also a place of local pilgrimage as it has the shrine to 'Our Lady of the Highlands' within its grounds. A new altar at this shrine, or grotto, was dedicated by bishop Hugh Gilbert in March 2017.

History

The church was built in 1859 by Ross and Joass. The original wooden altar was later replaced by one in marble which was removed from St Mary's, Nairn. Prior to the church being built Mass was said in a house in Dalcrag by a priest based in Glenmoriston who rowed across Loch Ness to say Mass.

St. Mary MacKillop visited this church on 12-13 December 1873, during a visit from Australia and remarked upon the clean and simple quarters of the Parish Priest, Fr. Bissett.

References

External links

1859 establishments in Scotland
Churches in Highland (council area)
19th-century Roman Catholic church buildings in the United Kingdom
History of the Scottish Highlands